Ajit Singh 
(11 February 1687 –23 December 1704), also referred to with honorifics as Sahibzada Ajit Singh or Baba Ajit Singh, was the eldest son of Guru Gobind Singh and the son of Mata Sundari. His younger brothers were Jujhar Singh, Zorawar Singh and Fateh Singh, but they had been born to Mata Jito. He was killed in the Second Battle of Chamkaur along with his brother Jujhar Singh. His other two brothers, Zorawar Singh and Fateh Singh, nine and seven years old, respectively, were bricked alive at Fatehgarh Sahib on order of Wazir Khan, governor of Sirhind-Fategarh.

Early life 
Ajit Singh was born to Mata Sundari and Guru Gobind Singh at Paonta Sahib on 11 February 1687. He was brought up in Anandpur, where his education included religious texts, history, and philosophy. He received training from Jeevan Singh (Bhai Jaita) in riding and the martial arts of swordsmanship and archery.

The Ranghars of Nuh 
He was given his first military assignment when barely 12 years old. A Muslim tribe, the Rangers of prophet Noh, had attacked and looted a Sikh Sangat (congregation) coming from the Pothohar region of northwest Punjab. Guru Gobind Singh sent Ajit Singh in command of 100 men to the village, which was a short distance from Anandpur across the River Satluj. Ajit Singh reached the village on 23 May 1699, recovered the looted property, and punished the offenders.

Anandpur and Nirmohgarh 
In 1700 Anandpur was attacked by hill chiefs assisted by troops provided by the Mughal faujdar of Sirhind. Guru Gobind Singh had erected five Qila (forts) on the outskirts of the city. Ajit Singh, assisted by Bhai Udai Singh, a seasoned soldier, was put in charge of the defense of the Qila Taragarh Sahib. On 29 August in the Battle of Taragarh the hill chiefs made the fort the target for their first attack, which was successfully repulsed. For four days the chiefs attacked the fortresses around the citadel, without success.

On 15 March 1701, a Sikh Sangat coming from the Darap area (near Sialkot) was waylaid by Gujjars and Rangers. Ajit Singh led a successful expedition against them.

In 1702, Ajit Singh along with the Sikh army defeated the Mughals in the Battle of Nirmohgarh (1702) and later in the Battle of Basoli.

Restoring a Brahmin's wife 

In March 1703, Dewki Das, a Brahmin came to Anandpur and requested the Guru to help him in getting back his wife whom Chowdhry Jabar Khan, the chief of Dera Bassi, had taken away forcibly; the Guru asked Sahibzada Ajit Singh and Bhai Udey Singh to help the Brahmin. On 7 March 1703, both of them, joined by about one hundred Sikhs, went to Bassi Kalan; they put siege to the village and sent a message to Jabar Khan to return the Brahmin's wife; but Jabar Khan, instead of returning the Brahmin's wife, asked his soldiers to attack the Sikhs; it was followed by a full-fledged battle, in which Jabar Khan was killed; the Brahmin's wife was restored to him. When this news reached the people, they praised the Sikhs for their role.

Second Battle of Chamkaur

When Mughal forces besieged Anandpur in 1704, during which a long stalemate occurred, the Mughal faujdar gave his assurances that he only wanted the fort of Anandpur and would let the population of the town go unharmed. Anandpur was vacated on the night of 5th and 6 December 1704. Ajit Singh was given the command of the rearguard. As the besiegers, violating their solemn promises, attacked the column, he stoutly engaged them on a hill-feature called Shahi Tibbi until he was relieved by Udai Singh. Ajit Singh crossed the Sirsa rivulet, then in spate, along with his father, younger brother, Jujhar Singh, and some others. Further reduced in numbers by casualties at the hands of pursuing troops from Ropar, the column reached Kotla Nihang and then proceeded to Chamkaur on the night between 6th and 7 December 1704. There they rested for some hours in the fortress of Budhi Chand Rawat. But, in the afternoon the Muslim soldiers from Malerkotla and Sirhind reached there, surrounded the fortress, and threw a tight ring around it. The Sikhs too took up position. An unequal but grim battle started. The Sikhs had exhausted the meagre stock of ammunitions and arrows, hence they made sallies in batches of five each to engage the encircling host, of the much larger army, with sword and spear. There were only 40 Sikhs.

Ajit Singh led one of the sallies and laid down his life fighting in the thick of the battle. Gurdwara Katalgarh now marks the spot where he fell, followed by Jujhar Singh who led the next sally. Their bodies and the bodies of the other martyr Sikhs were cremated by Sharan Kaur Pabla. An annual fair known as Shaheedi Jor Mela is held to remark their martyrdoms in December - January.

Commemoration 

Ajitgarh, one of the largest cities in Punjab lying adjacent to its capital Chandigarh, has been named in the memory of Sahibzada Ajit Singh, Ajitgarh ('Home of Ajit'). It is located in the district of the state which is also named after him Sahibzada Ajit Singh Nagar District.

Gallery

See also 

Jujhar Singh
Zorawar Singh
Fateh Singh
Martyrdom in Sikhism

References

Further reading

Indian Sikhs
Sikh martyrs
Sikh warriors
Family members of the Sikh gurus
History of Punjab
Punjabi people
1687 births
1704 deaths